Laado ('Lovely daughter') is a 2000 Indian Haryanvi-language romance film directed by Ashwini Chaudhary, starring Ashutosh Rana and Arundhati.

The film's music was composed by Lalit Sen and released on 5 October 2000.

Plot 
Urmi(Arundhati), a newly married young bride is left behind in the village with her in-laws, while her husband Arvind goes off to a job in the big city. Inder (Ashutosh Rana), her husband's cousin falls in love with her and proposes to her. Unable to deal with her husband's neglect and her in-laws nagging her for a child, Urmi escapes into a relationship with Inder. When the relationship comes out in the open, Urmi has to deal with not only the family's accusations but also her lover's cowardice. Declared guilty by the local village court, Urmi demands justice from a court made of all the village heads, where her husband's neglect and her lover's cowardice are revealed.

Cast 
 Arundhati as Urmi
 Ashutosh Rana as Inder Dahiya	
 Arun Bali as Chaudhary Nafe Singh
 Rajendra Gupta as Chaudhary Dilawar Singh		
 Arav Chowdharry as Arvind
 Sri Vallabh Vyas as Chaudhary Jorawar Singh

Soundtrack

Awards
 Won the Indira Gandhi Award for Best Debut Film of a Director at the 2000 National Film Awards. This was the first time a Haryanvi movie won a national award.

References

External links 
 

2000 films
Haryanvi-language films
Films scored by Lalit Sen
Best Debut Feature Film of a Director National Film Award winners
2000 directorial debut films